The 2018–19 Nedbank Cup was the 2018–19 edition of South Africa's premier knockout club football (soccer) competition, the Nedbank Cup.

1st round

Brackets

2nd round

Quarter-finals

Semi-final

Final

TS Galaxy became the first club from the second tier to win South Africa's national cup.

Statistics

External links
Nedbank Cup Official Website

Notes and references

2018–19 domestic association football cups
2018–19 in South African soccer
2018–19